"Dream On" is a power ballad by Aerosmith from their 1973 debut album, Aerosmith. Written by lead singer Steven Tyler, this song was their first major hit and became a classic rock radio staple. Released in June 1973, it peaked at number 59 on the Billboard Hot 100 but hit big in the band's native Boston, where it was the number one single of the year on WBZ-FM, number five for the year on WRKO and number 16 on WMEX (AM). The song also received immediate heavy airplay on the former WVBF (FM), often showing up in the #1 position on "The Top Five at Five" in June 1973.

The album version of "Dream On" (4:28, as opposed to the 3:25 1973 45 rpm edit where most of the intro has been edited out and the first chorus is replaced with the second chorus) was re-issued in late 1975, debuting at number 81 on the Billboard Hot 100 chart on January 10, 1976, breaking into the top 40 on February 14 and peaking at number 6 on April 10. Columbia Records chose to service top 40 radio stations with both long and short versions of the song, thus many 1976 pop radio listeners were exposed to the group's first top 10 effort through the 45 edit.

In 2004, Rolling Stone magazine ranked the song at number 172 on its list of the 500 Greatest Songs of All Time. It was moved to number 173 in 2010, and re-ranked at number 199 in 2021. In 2007, Aerosmith would perform a re-recording of the song, amongst some of their other songs, for the game Guitar Hero: Aerosmith as the master track was missing during the game's development. In 2018, the song was inducted into the Grammy Hall of Fame.

Background
In a 2011 interview, Tyler reminisced about his father, a Juilliard-trained musician. He recalled lying beneath his dad's piano as a three-year-old listening to him play classical music. "That's where I got that Dream On chordage", he said. Lyrical composition was completed when Steven was 14 years old. The song is also famous for its building climax to showcase Tyler's trademark screams.

In the authorized Stephen Davis band memoir Walk This Way, Tyler speaks at length about the origins of the songs:

Legacy

Reception
Cash Box said that "the hard surface is there but Tyler's plaintive vocals and some economical muscular riffing make 'Dream On' a thinker as well as a mover."

Live performances

Long a concert staple, the song's piano part has been played live by Tyler. The band has also played "Dream On" with an orchestra on occasion. One of these performances, conducted by Michael Kamen, was performed live for MTV's 10th Anniversary (in 1991) and included on the soundtrack for the movie Last Action Hero.

On September 19, 2006, Aerosmith dedicated the song to captured Israeli soldier Ehud Goldwasser. On September 22, 2007, at a concert in Atlantic City, New Jersey, Aerosmith dedicated the song to one of their fans, Monica Massaro, who had been murdered earlier that year. On May 25, 2011, Tyler performed a brief rendition of the song live during the finale of the tenth season of American Idol.

In 2006, Tyler and Joe Perry performed the song live with the Boston Pops Orchestra at their Fourth of July spectacular. In August 2010, Tyler performed much of the song on a grand piano on top of the Green Monster at an Aerosmith concert at Boston's Fenway Park, joined by the rest of the band to close out the song. After the Boston Marathon bombing, Tyler performed the song at the Boston Strong concert in late May 2013.

In 2022, at rapper Eminem’s Rock and Roll Hall of Fame induction concert, Tyler performed the introductory line and the chorus to Dream On, along with Eminem as he performed his 2002 hit Sing for the Moment, which used the former’s chorus as its chorus.

Appearances on other albums
The song has appeared on almost every Aerosmith greatest hits and live compilation, including:

Live! Bootleg
Greatest Hits
Classics Live I
A Little South of Sanity
Big Ones (as a bonus track in CD 2)
Young Lust: The Aerosmith Anthology
O, Yeah! Ultimate Aerosmith Hits
Devil's Got a New Disguise
Music from the Original Motion Picture "Last Action Hero"

It also appears on both of the band's box sets.

Other
In 2002, the song was sampled by American rapper Eminem for the song "Sing for the Moment", from his 2002 album The Eminem Show. Joe Perry played the guitar solo on the track and the chorus features Steven Tyler singing, with Eminem adding "sing", "sing with me" and "come on" in the refrain as well.
In 2011, the song was sampled by Immortal Technique on his song "Angels & Demons", on his album The Martyr.
In the Kia Stinger TV commercial that ran during the 2018 Super Bowl, Steven Tyler appears to drive the eponymous car at high speed in reverse while snatches of "Dream On" play in a sampled fashion.
In 2022, "Dream On" experienced a resurgence in popularity on social media following its usage in a meme in which Kratos, the protagonist of the God of War video game series, falls off Mount Olympus while the song's chorus plays; the song subsequently attained 720 million streams on Spotify.

Charts

Weekly charts

Year-end charts

Certifications

References

1970s ballads
1972 songs
1973 debut singles
1976 singles
Aerosmith songs
Baseball songs and chants
Columbia Records singles
Hard rock ballads
Music videos directed by Marty Callner
Neil Patrick Harris songs
Songs about dreams
Songs written by Steven Tyler
Song recordings produced by Adrian Barber